Vels  is a rural locality (a settlement) in Krasnovishersky District, Perm Krai, Russia. The population was 198 as of 2010. There are 9  streets.

Geography 
Vels is located 142 km northeast of Krasnovishersk (the district's administrative centre) by road. Vaya is the nearest rural locality.

References 

Rural localities in Krasnovishersky District